Strathfield is a suburb in the Inner West of Sydney, in the state of New South Wales, Australia. It is located 12 kilometres west of the Sydney central business district and is the administrative centre of the Municipality of Strathfield. A small section of the suburb north of the railway line lies within the City of Canada Bay, while the area east of The Boulevard lies within the Municipality of Burwood. North Strathfield and Strathfield South are separate suburbs to the north and south, respectively.

History
The Strathfield district lies between the Concord Plains to the north and the Cooks River to the south, and was originally occupied by the Wangal clan. European colonisation in present-day Strathfield commenced in 1793 with the issue of land grants in the area of "Liberty Plains", an area including present-day Strathfield as well as surrounding areas, where the first free settlers received land grants. In 1808, a grant was made to James Wilshire, which forms the largest part of the current suburb of Strathfield. This grant was bounded by present-day The Boulevarde, Chalmers Street and Liverpool Road. Wiltshire's  grant by Governor Macquarie in 1808 [regranted 1810] followed representations from Lord Nelson, a relation by marriage of Wilshire.

In the west, Wiltshire's grant neighboured an area that was granted in 1823 to the Church of England, to support clergy in the colony, which covered the western part of present-day Strathfield and Flemington (Homebush West). The church lands were sold in 1841

Ownership of Wiltshire's grant was transferred in 1824 to ex-convict Samuel Terry. The land became known as the Redmire Estate, which Michael Jones says could either be named after his home town in (Redmire) in North Yorkshire, England, or could be named after the "red clay of the Strathfield area".

Birth of Strathfield

The railway came to Strathfield in 1855, with Homebush station built as one of the initial four stations on the railway line between Sydney and Parramatta. A station was sited here because of the presence of Homebush Racecourse north of Parramatta Road. The arrival of the railway spurred residential development. Subdivision of the "Redmire Estate" began in 1867, which led to residential development forming the village of "Redmire" or "Redmyre". An early buyer was one-time Mayor of Sydney, Walter Renny who built in 1868 a house they called Stratfieldsaye, possibly after the Duke of Wellington's mansion near Reading, Berkshire. It may have also been named after the transport ship of the same name that transported many immigrants – including Sir Henry Parkes – to Australia, though the transport ship was probably also named after the Duke's mansion as it was built soon after his death and was likely named in his honour. A plaque marking the location of Stratfield Saye can be found in the footpath of Strathfield Avenue, marking the approximate location of the original house [though some of the wording on the plaque is incorrect]. According to local historian Cathy Jones, "ownership of [Stratfieldsaye] was transferred several times including to Davidson Nichol, who shortened the name to 'Strathfield House', then 'Strathfield'." In 1877, development had progressed sufficiently to justify the addition of a halt on the railway line at Redmyre, east of existing Homebush station. The Village of Homebush Estate, part of which forms the northern part of today's Strathfield, was subdivided in 1878.

By 1885, sufficient numbers of people resided in the district to enable incorporation of its own local government. "Strathfield" as a geographical name was first established when Strathfield Council was proclaimed on 2 June 1885 by the Governor of NSW, Sir Augustus Loftus, after residents of the Redmire area petitioned the New South Wales State government for the establishment of local government. The new local government area included parts of the three established residential areas of Redmire (now central Strathfield), Homebush (now Homebush South and northern Strathfield) and Druitt Town (now southern Strathfield). Residents in Homebush and Druitt Town formed their own unsuccessful counter-petition. It is likely that the region was named Strathfield to neutralise the rivalry between Homebush and Redmire. The railway station was also renamed "Strathfield" in 1885, and it became an important interchange station when the Great Northern Railway was opened the following year, between Strathfield and Hornsby.

Strathfield Council

Strathfield Council was incorporated in 1885 and included parts of the then-established suburbs of Redmire, Homebush and Druitt Town. The part of Redmire incorporated into Strathfield Council included the central part of today's suburb of Strathfield, the part of Homebush incorporated into Strathfield included the southern part of today's suburb of Homebush as well as the northern part of today's Strathfield (Village of Homebush or Homebush South), and the part of Druitt Town incorporated into Strathfield included the southern part of today's Strathfield. In directories, addresses in all three areas were included under "Strathfield" after the council was established.

The adjoining areas of Flemington, North Homebush and southern Druitt Town was unincorporated. The southern part of Flemington was annexed to Strathfield Council in 1892 (now the southern part of Homebush West and the western part of Strathfield), which increased the size of the Council area by about 50%. The Council formed three wards – Flemington, Homebush and Strathfield – and Aldermen was elected to represent their ward at Council. Wards were abolished in 1916. Today's suburb of Strathfield encompasses the entire Council area as enlarged in 1892, except for a small area immediately to the south of Homebush and Flemington stations. When the separate Municipality of Homebush was amalgamated with Strathfield Council in 1947, the former village centres immediately south of Homebush and Flemington stations were carved out of Strathfield and joined with the east and west parts of Homebush Council areas respectively to create the modern suburbs of Homebush and Homebush West.

Meanwhile, the southern part of Druitt Town which was not incorporated into Strathfield became part of Enfield Council, then was amalgamated into Strathfield Council in 1949 and renamed "Strathfield South".

The eastern part of former Redmire - renamed Strathfield - became part of Burwood Council. The boundary between Strathfield and Burwood was a straight line running north–south aligned with the Boulevarde, and as a result there was a small portion to the north of Strathfield Council boundaries and west of Burwood Council boundaries that was not part of either council. This portion became part of Concord Council (later combined into the City of Canada Bay). This has resulted in the modern suburb of Strathfield being split between the three councils.

Residential and commercial development
The suburb of Strathfield became a popular residential suburb in the late 19th and early 20th centuries. The building of Strathfield station, and its expansion into a major suburban, intercity and interstate station, with direct services to Sydney Central, Melbourne and Canberra, helped to make the suburb one of the most accessible in Sydney by rail. It was also close to major road and water transport routes. Members of Sydney's business elite, such as the family of William Arnott and David Jones, built various large homes in Strathfield. After federation, Strathfield continued to be favoured by business and political leaders, with prime ministers Earle Page, George Reid and Frank Forde all having lived in the suburb, and Billy Hughes lived in the part of "Strathfield" which is now Homebush South. Page, for example, chose to live in Strathfield because of its direct rail services to Melbourne, then the seat of federal parliament, and his electorate on the north coast of New South Wales. Some of the large homes built in this period were purchased by private schools, and the unusually large number of private and public schools in the one suburb further increased residential demand.

Following the introduction of the Local Government Act in 1919, Strathfield Council was one of the first to proclaim the major part of its area a residential district by proclamation in 1920. Strathfield underwent suburban subdivision in the early 20th century, with more suburban houses on smaller lots being built rather than the substantial mansions with expansive grounds built in the earlier period. Nevertheless, it remained a popular residential area. In 1977, Strathfield was the most expensive suburb in metropolitan Sydney measured by median house price.

More significant commercial development took place in the last quarter of the 20th century, with a "modern" shopping centre, Strathfield Plaza, opening in 1981, accompanied by the first high rise residential apartment building in the suburb. More towers followed in the next few decades, concentrated around the station.

Strathfield Murders
On 17 August 1991, seven people were killed, when Wade Frankum stabbed a fifteen-year-old girl to death, before running amok with a rifle in the Strathfield Plaza shopping mall, and then turning the weapon on himself. This is commonly known as the Strathfield Massacre. A Memorial plaque is located at Churchill Avenue, Strathfield.

Heritage listings 
Strathfield has a number of heritage-listed sites, including:
 25A Barker Road: Mount St Mary Campus of the Australian Catholic University
Great Southern and Western railway: Strathfield rail underbridges
 Great Southern and Western railway: Strathfield railway station
 62 The Boulevarde: Trinity Uniting Church, Strathfield

Schools
Strathfield has an unusually large concentration of educational institutions in one suburb.

The government schools located in Strathfield include the two secondary schools Strathfield Girls High School and Strathfield South High School. The catchment of Strathfield Girls stretches north to Concord West, west to Homebush West and east to the western part of Burwood, but does not include the southern-most section of the suburb of Strathfield itself. Strathfield South High School is co-educational, and its catchment includes the southern-most section of Strathfield, as well as the suburbs further south including parts of Chullora and Greenacre, Belfield, Strathfield South, Enfield and Croydon Park. A boys' high school is located in nearby Homebush.

Two government comprehensive primary schools are located in Strathfield, Marie Bashir Public School in north-central Strathfield and Strathfield South Public School. Two others are located nearby to the north: Homebush Public School in Homebush, which also serves the northernmost part of Strathfield, and Strathfield North Public School in the separate suburb of North Strathfield. Chalmers Road Public School, also located in Strathfield, is a state government school for students aged four to eighteen years with moderate or severe intellectual disabilities.

A large number of independent or church-affiliated schools are also located in Strathfield. These include:
 St Patrick's College is an independent, Roman Catholic, day school for boys.
 Santa Sabina College is an independent, Roman Catholic, Dominican, day school for girls K-12 and boys K-4. The primary school is known as Santa Maria Del Monte.
 Meriden Anglican School for Girls is an independent, Anglican, day school for girls..
 Trinity Grammar School Preparatory School campus is on The Boulevarde and has classes from Pre-Kindergarten to Year 6.
 St Martha's Primary School is a Roman Catholic primary school.

Strathfield is also home to a major campus of the Australian Catholic University, the former home of the Christian Brothers novitiate and Catholic Teachers' College. The Seminary of the Good Shepherd, which trains Catholic priests, straddles the boundary between Strathfield and Homebush. In addition, the Catholic Institute of Sydney, where priests for the Archdiocese of Sydney, and other theologians and ministers, are trained, is located in Strathfield, on a site which was originally the NSW Society for the Blind, and later an Australia Post training centre. Nearby, 'Arnottholme', the former home of William Arnott, is used by the NSW Department of Education, including as a training facility for teachers.

Churches
 Carrington Avenue Uniting Church
 St Anne's Anglican Church
 St David's Presbyterian Church
 St Martha's Catholic Church
 Sts Peter and Paul Russian Orthodox Cathedral
 Ukrainian Autocephalic Orthodox Church of the Protection of the Theotokos
 Strathfield Korean Uniting Church
 Sydney Chinese Seventh-day Adventist Church
 Trinity Uniting Church, Strathfield
 Western Sydney Chinese Christian Church

Residential landscape
Strathfield has a long history as a "desirable suburb for Sydney's better classes", especially prior to the building of the Sydney Harbour Bridge allowed residential development to flourish on the North Shore. Although the Inner West region became eclipsed by the Eastern Suburbs and the North Shore as premium residential areas, Strathfield with its boulevardes, large houses and established schools remained a popular suburb for residents. Even in 1977, Strathfield was the most expensive suburb in metropolitan Sydney by median house price. In December 2021, Strathfield (post code area 2135) was the 13th most expensive area by postcode in Australia, when measured by median house price. Of the top 20 most expensive post code areas (all of which are in metropolitan Sydney), Strathfield was the only one which was located outside the Eastern Suburbs, North Shore or Northern Beaches regions.

Strathfield's residential landscape is extremely varied, ranging from country-style estates to high-rise apartments. Many styles of architecture have been employed over past decades, with dwellings having been constructed in Victorian, Federation, Interwar period architecture, Californian Bungalow and contemporary periods.  One of the oldest surviving houses built in the 1870s is Fairholm which is now a retirement village called Strathfield Gardens.

Primarily these have been replaced by modern, multimillion-dollar mansions, although Strathfield has retained its wide avenues and most of the extensive natural vegetation. Streets such as Victoria Street, Llandillo Avenue and Kingsland Road predominantly feature older mansions, while Agnes Street, Newton Road and Barker Road are common locations for new homes.

In the vicinity of Homebush Road, a number of noted tree-lined avenues follow an oblique street pattern established by the development of the Village of Homebush in the late 19th century, and are noted for the grand, historic houses built in the late 19th and early 20th centursies. These include Albert Road, historically known as one of Sydney's most prestigious streets and was lined by landmark mansions. Some of these have been replaced by institutions and others have been subdivided, but the street retains some of the most prestigious houses in the area;. and Redmyre Road, a wide boulevard which retains most of its Victorian mansions and large Federation-era houses.

Further to the southeast, a pocket of the suburb bounded by Hunter Street, Carrington Avenue, Homebush Road and the Boulevarde is known in the real estate press as the "Golden Mile", because it contains some of the most desirable and highly sought-after real estate in the area. Examples of prestigious addresses in this area include homes located on Cotswold Road,  Strathfield Avenue, Llandilo Avenue, Agnes and Highgate Street.

Additionally, decreasing land sizes through subdivision has led to an increase in residential densities, reflecting the outward expansion of Sydney's inner city. A large proportion of Strathfield's population now dwells in apartments with the area immediately surrounding Strathfield railway station dominated by high rise residential towers. Smaller apartment buildings are located in other areas within the suburbs, were mostly built during the 1960s and 1970s.

In the last century a number of grand Strathfield homes became independent school campuses:
 Holyrood – Santa Sabina
 Brunyarra – Santa Maria Del Monte
 Lauriston – Santa Maria Del Monte
 Llandilo – Trinity Grammar School
 Somerset – Trinity Grammar School
 Milverton – Trinity Grammar School
 Riccarton/The Briars – Meriden and partially demolished
 Wariora – Meriden and now demolished
 Lingwood/Branxton – PLC Sydney and now Meriden School
 Selbourne – Meriden and now demolished
 Telerah – Wadham Preparatory School, later purchased by Meriden and now demolished

Commercial area and transport

Strathfield's commercial town centre is centred on a town square south of the station, and includes the Strathfield Plaza shopping centre which includes Woolworths and other stores, as well as a large number of cafes, restaurants and other stores located around the square and along Albert Road, Churchill Avenue, Redmyre Road and the Boulevarde. Strathfield's town centre is particularly known for a large concentration of Korean restaurants and shops catering to Korean cultural needs. The area is often called Little Korea.

Other commercial areas in the suburb include a small commercial area immediately north of the station, a commercial area along the southern boundary concentrated around the intersection of the Boulevarde and Liverpool Road (part of a town centre around the former Enfield Town Hall). The northern parts of Strathfield are served by the Homebush and Flemington village centres, which were carved out of the suburb of Strathfield after 1947.

There are also some car dealerships and other commercial premises along Parramatta Road and Liverpool Road, on the northern and southern boundaries of the suburb.

Strathfield railway station is a major interchange on the Sydney Trains and NSW TrainLink networks, and has long been an interchange for several of Sydney's suburban lines, as well as intercity services and interstate services. However, intercity services from Strathfield significantly reduced in 2013. With the upgrading of the East Hills line, intercity trains heading southwest to Canberra and Melbourne from Sydney Central began to use that line, leaving only intercity trains to the north and west to continue using Strathfield station. The bus station located on the town square, immediately south of the station, is an interchange for buses serving the Inner West.

In the west, Strathfield is bounded by the A3 arterial road, linking Strathfield with the St George region, where it joins the A1 road (Princes Highway) towards Sutherland Shire and the south coast, while in the north it connects Strathfield with Ryde and Pymble and Gordon, where it intersects with the A1 road again and then proceeds towards the Northern Beaches.

Strathfield is bounded in the north by the Great Western Highway (Parramatta Road) and in the south by the Hume Highway (Liverpool Road), both major arterial roads. The Great Western Highway links Strathfield east to Ashfield, where it splits with Parramatta Road proceeding to east towards Broadway and the southern City and the A4 road proceeding northeast to the Sydney CBD and Sydney Harbour Bridge. To the west, it leads to Parramatta, Blacktown, Penrith and beyond. The Hume Highway links Strathfield east to Ashfield, where it joins Parramatta Road, and west to Bankstown, Liverpool, Canberra and Melbourne. The M4 Western Motorway largely parallels the Great Western Highway but lies outside Strathfield suburb boundaries. The exit at Concord Road in North Strathfield serves Strathfield.

Two local arterial routes serving the Inner West, formed by Concord Road-Raw Square-The Boulevarde (north-south, formerly part of Metroad 3 and State Route 27) and Beresford Road-Albert Road-Redmyre Road-Morwick Street (west-east), join and intersect in central Strathfield in a complex pattern.

Demographics

The most common other countries of birth were China 10.3%, India 10.1%, South Korea 9.8%, Nepal 5.3% and Vietnam 2.7%. The most common ancestries were Chinese 19.6%, Indian 10.0%, Korean 9.9%, English 7.4% and Australian 6.9% with 75.6% of people having both parents born overseas.

29.1% of people only spoke English at home. Other languages spoken at home included Korean 10.9%, Mandarin 10.6%, Cantonese 7.6%, Nepali 5.3% and Tamil 4.0%. The most common responses for religion were No Religion 23.3%, Catholic 23.1% and Hinduism 16.2%.

Residents
The following were either born or have lived at some time in the suburb of Strathfield:

Architecture
 George Sydney Jones (1868–1927), architect of Trinity Congregational Church and the following Strathfield houses; Springfort (1894); Darenth (1895); Bickley (1894); Treghre (1899); and Luleo (1912).
 Harry Kent (1852–1938), architect, alderman for the Municipality of Strathfield and architect of the Strathfield Town Hall.

Business
 William Arnott, founder of Arnott's Biscuits.
  Sir Robert Crichton-Brown (1919–2013), businessman, soldier and sailor, lived in Strathfield in the 1920s and 1930s.
Charles Henry Hoskins (1851-1926), industrialist and businessman, lived in Strathfield during the 1890s and 1900s.
 Edward Lloyd Jones (1844–1894), head of the department store David Jones Limited, and his son;
 Edward Lloyd Jones (1874–1934), Shorthorn cattle breeder and former chairman of David Jones Limited, and his brother;
 Charles Lloyd Jones (1878–1958), former chairman of David Jones Limited and former chairman of the Australian Broadcasting Commission.

Education
 [Brian Rees] (1929–2016), [Headmaster of Merchant Taylors, Charterhouse and Rugby School, UK], was born in Strathfield.

Fashion and society
 Lady McMahon (1932–2010), spouse of the 20th Prime Minister of Australia, was born in Strathfield.

Law
 David Wilson KC (1879–1965), barrister and company director.

Medicine
 Sir Philip Sydney Jones (1836–1918), medical practitioner and University of Sydney vice-chancellor lived at Llandilo on The Boulevarde.

Politics
 Sir George Reid, 4th Prime Minister of Australia.
 Earl Page (1880–1961), 11th Prime Minister of Australia.
 Frank Forde, 15th Prime Minister of Australia.

Religion
 Rev Professor Hubert Cunliffe-Jones (1905–1991): Congregational church minister, chair of the Congregational Union of England and Wales and a professor at the University of Manchester was the son of the Rev Walter Cunliffe-Jones of the Strathfield-Homebush Congregational church (now Uniting Church – Korean Parish).

Science
 F. J. Duarte: author and physicist, lived in Leicester Avenue, Strathfield.

Entertainment
 Bang Chan, member and leader of the South Korean boy band Stray Kids, lived in Strathfield for some time during his teenage years.

Sport
 Alan Davidson (1929−2021), cricketer
 Daphne Akhurst (1903–1933), tennis player

Other people
Katharine Gatty, suffragette
Anu Singh, convicted of murdering her boyfriend
Derek Percy, convicted child killer

Culture
Strathfield has made an impact on the indie rock and indie pop scene, producing bands such as Prince Vlad & the Gargoyle Impalers,  Lunatic Fringe, The Mexican Spitfires and Women of Troy. It has also inspired pop songs such as The Mexican Spitfires's song "Rookwood" about Rookwood Cemetery and the legendary Blitzkrieg punk rock of Radio Birdman's classic mid-1970s "Murder City Nights". Indie pop legend Grant McLennan of The Go-Betweens also called Carrington Avenue, Strathfield home for a few years in the 1990s.

Gallery

References

External links

 http://www.strathfieldheritage.org
  [CC-By-SA] (Koreans in Sydney)

 
Strathfield area, History of the
Populated places established in 1885